Darvishi may refer to:
 Darvishi, Bushehr
 Darvishi, Khuzestan